There have been three baronetcies created for members of the Mosley family, one in the Baronetage of England and two in the Baronetage of Great Britain. Only one creation is extant. Since 1980, the title has been held jointly with Baron Ravensdale in the Peerage of the United Kingdom.

First baronetcy
The first Mosley baronetcy, of Rolleston in the County of Stafford, was created in the Baronetage of England on 10 July 1640 for Edward Mosley, of Rolleston Hall, a grandson of Sir Nicholas Mosley of Hough End Hall (who acquired the Manor of Manchester in 1596 and was Lord Mayor of London in 1599) and nephew of the lawyer Sir Edward Mosley (the youngest son of Sir Nicholas and his first wife Marjorie, née Whitbroke). Sir Edward was a lawyer who had been knighted by King James I of England in 1614; appointed a justice of the peace and Attorney-General for the Duchy of Lancaster; and elected as a member of parliament for Preston in 1614, 1620–2, and 1624–5. It was Sir Edward who first acquired the properties of Rolleston Hall and Rolleston on Dove that became the family seat. Sir Edward (1596–1638) died unmarried and without issue, and his estates were inherited by his nephew—the Edward Mosley who was to become the 1st Baronet.

The 1st Baronet's father was Rowland Mosley (1558–1616), another son of the aforesaid Sir Nicholas and his wife Marjorie.

The second Baronet, also called Edward, sat as member of parliament for St Michaels. The baronetcy became extinct on his death in 1665.

Second baronetcy
The second Mosley baronetcy, of Rolleston in the County of Stafford, was created in the Baronetage of Great Britain on 18 June 1720 for Oswald Mosley, a third cousin of the second Baronet of the 1640 creation. The title became extinct on the death of the third Baronet in 1779.

Third baronetcy
The third Mosley baronetcy, of Ancoats in the County of Lancaster, was created in the Baronetage of Great Britain on 8 June 1781 for John Mosley, who was a first cousin of the third Baronet of the 1720 creation. His grandson, the second Baronet, represented several constituencies in the House of Commons. His grandson, the fourth Baronet, served as High Sheriff of Staffordshire in 1915.

The sixth Baronet, Sir Oswald Mosley, grandson of the fourth Baronet, gained notoriety as the founder of the British Union of Fascists. He married as his first wife Lady Cynthia, second daughter of George Curzon, 1st Marquess Curzon of Kedleston. Lady Cynthia and her two sisters were in special remainder to the barony of Ravensdale created for their father in 1911. After her early death in 1933, Mosley married as his second wife the Hon. Diana Mitford, former wife of the Hon. Bryan Guinness and one of the famous Mitford sisters. In 1966, Mosley's son from his first marriage, the seventh Baronet, succeeded his aunt as third Baron Ravensdale. On his father's death in 1980, he also inherited the baronetcy of Ancoats, which now is a subsidiary title of the barony. On his death in 2017, the baronetcy was succeeded by his grandson.

Tonman Mosley, 1st Baron Anslow, younger son of the third Baronet, was a politician. Max Mosley, second son in the second marriage of the sixth Baronet, was the long-serving President of the Fédération Internationale de l'Automobile.

The family seat was Rolleston Hall, near Rolleston-on-Dove, Staffordshire.

Mosley baronets, of Rolleston (1640)
Sir Edward Mosley, 1st Baronet (1616–1657)
Sir Edward Mosley, 2nd Baronet (–1665)

Mosley baronets, of Rolleston (1720) 
Sir Oswald Mosley, 1st Baronet (1674–1751)
Sir Oswald Mosley, 2nd Baronet, of Rolleston (1705–1757)
Sir John Mosley, 3rd Baronet (died 1779)

Mosley baronets, of Ancoats (1781)
Sir John Mosley, 1st Baronet (1732–1798)
Sir Oswald Mosley, 2nd Baronet (1785–1871) The arms of the 2nd Baronet are blazoned: Quarterly—1st and 4th, sable a chevron between three battle axes argent; 2nd and 3rd, or a fesse between three eagles displayed sable. Crest—An eagle displayed ermine. Motto—.
Sir Tonman Mosley, 3rd Baronet (1813–1890)
Sir Oswald Mosley, 4th Baronet (1848–1915)
Sir Oswald Mosley, 5th Baronet (1873–1928)
Sir Oswald Ernald Mosley, 6th Baronet (1896–1980)
Nicholas Mosley, 3rd Baron Ravensdale, 7th Baronet (1923–2017); also succeeded his aunt as Baron Ravensdale in 1966
Daniel Nicholas Mosley, 4th Baron Ravensdale, 8th Baronet (born 1982)

The heir apparent to both the barony and the baronetcy is the titleholder's eldest son, the Honourable Alexander Lucas Mosley (b. 2012).

See also
Baron Ravensdale
Baron Anslow
Marquess Curzon of Kedleston

References

Sources 
Mosley, Sir Oswald (2nd Baronet Ancoats). Family Memoirs. Printed for private circulation, 1849.
Mosley Pedigree from Stirnet
Bradshaw, L. D. (1985) Origins of Street Names in the City of Manchester. Radcliffe: Neil Richardson. ; pp. 32–34.

 
Baronetcies in the Baronetage of Great Britain
Extinct baronetcies in the Baronetage of England
Extinct baronetcies in the Baronetage of Great Britain
1640 establishments in England
1720 establishments in Great Britain